Eggert Guðmundsson (born 6 April 1964) is an Icelandic former football goalkeeper. He made his international debut with Iceland 1985 in the World Cup Qualification against Scotland. He played his entire professional football career in Sweden.

References

1964 births
Living people
Eggert Gudmundsson
Eggert Gudmundsson
Eggert Gudmundsson
Allsvenskan players
Halmstads BK players
Trelleborgs FF players
Falkenbergs FF players
Degerfors IF players
Eggert Gudmundsson
Expatriate footballers in Sweden
Association football goalkeepers